The 20th Iris Awards ceremony, organised by the Academy of Television Arts and Sciences, honoured the best in Spanish television of 2018 and took place at the Cines Kinépolis in Pozuelo de Alarcón on 23 October 2018.

Awards 
Hosted by Boris Izaguirre, the ceremony was broadcast on Twitter. The television channel Antena 3 was the night's biggest winner, as well as the shows Cocaine Coast and Operación Triunfo. Besides the Iris awards conceded by the academy, the jury's and critics' Iris awards were also delivered during the ceremony. The critics' award was gifted to Atresmedia Studios' Sonia Martínez. The jury's awards were gifted to Carlos Sedes & Jorge Torregrossa, Clásicos y Reverentes, Eso no se pregunta, Informe Robinson, Jalis de la Serna (for Enviado especial) and Elena de Lorenzo. The awards given by the academy are listed as follows:

Informational notes

References 

2018 television awards
2018 in Spanish television
Spanish television awards
2018 in the Community of Madrid